Jack Bainbridge is an English professional footballer who plays for Southport as a midfielder.

Club career

Sunderland

Bainbridge made his debut for Sunderland in the EFL Trophy on 13 November 2018 against Morecambe.

Southport

On 29 August 2020 Bainbridge signed for Southport on a free transfer from Sunderland. In January 2022 Bainbridge signed a contract extension through to May 2024.

Career statistics

Notes

References

1998 births
Living people
English footballers
Sunderland A.F.C. players
Association football defenders
Southport F.C. players